The Loan Market Association (LMA) was formed in December 1996 and is based in London, UK. Its initial aim was to assist in the development of the secondary loan market in Europe. Its intention was to develop industry best practice and standard documentation. The LMA is active in the primary market as well as the secondary market.

Role 
The LMA engages with its members, market participants and various stakeholders to tackle industry-wide issues and concerns and works with tax authorities, government bodies and a variety of national, European and US regulators.

Membership 
The LMA has over 770 members from 67 different jurisdictions. Members pay a subscription fee to the LMA in exchange for predefined membership benefits.

Education and events 
The LMA holds conferences across EMEA, including annual conferences and seminars.

The LMA offers its members the opportunity to enrol onto an e-learning course in the syndicated loan market and to drive efficiencies in the future.

Since August 2015, the LMA has been publishing webinars on key topics. The LMA also publishes video interviews with key figures within the industry.

References 

Finance industry associations
1996 establishments in the United Kingdom
Business organisations based in London
Financial services in the United Kingdom